The 2021–22 Super 6 (also known as the Fosroc Super 6 for sponsorship reasons) is the second season of a semi-professional rugby union competition for Scotland's club sides. The season tournament for 2020–21 did not take place due to the COVID-19 pandemic.

The six teams competing in this season's Super 6 are Ayrshire Bulls, Boroughmuir Bears, Heriot's Rugby, Stirling County, Watsonians and Southern Knights.

Competition format

 League Stage : Weeks One to Ten
All sides will play each other home and away in a double round robin, using the rugby points system.

 League play-offs
Final : The first and second place teams play to determine the winners and the runners-up of the Super 6 tournament .

3rd/4th play-off : The third and fourth placed teams play to determine the 3rd & 4th place slots.

5th/6th play-off : The fifth and sixth placed teams play to determine the 5rd & 6th place slots.

Coronavirus pandemic
The fixtures announced are subject to Scottish Government regulations regarding the COVID-19 pandemic.

Table

League stage rounds
All times are local.

Attendances limited due to the covid-19 pandemic.

Round 1

Round 2

Round 3

Round 4

Round 5

Round 6

Round 7

Round 8

Round 9

Round 10

Play-offs

 5th-6th place play-off

 3rd-4th place play-off

Super 6 final

Team of the Tournament

The 2021–22 Super 6 team of the tournament was named as follows:-

Leading points scorers

To be determined.

Leading try scorers

To be determined.

References

External links
SRU Super 6

 
2021–22 in European rugby union leagues
2021-22
2021–22 in Scottish rugby union